Jacob Øst-Hansen (born 18 August 1952), is a Danish chess FIDE Master (FM), Danish Chess Championship medalist (1976), Chess Olympiad individual medalist (1980), European Team Chess Championship individual medalist (1983).

Biography
From the mid-1970s to the mid-1980s Jacob Øst-Hansen was one of the leading Danish chess players. He participated in the finals of Danish Chess Championships and reached his best result in 1976, when he shared 2nd-7th place. In 1971, in Athens Jacob Øst-Hansen participated in 11th World Junior Chess Championship and shared 14th-15th place. As member of the Vejlby-Risskov SK team, he participated in the 1st official European Chess Club Cup (1976). The Danish team reached the quarterfinals and lost to one of the winners of the tournament - Burevestnik Moscow (USSR).

Jacob Øst-Hansen played for Denmark in the Chess Olympiads: 
 In 1976, at second board in the 22nd Chess Olympiad in Haifa (+3, =7, -1),
 In 1980, at first reserve board in the 24th Chess Olympiad in La Valletta (+5, =6, -0) and won individual bronze medal,
 In 1982, at fourth board in the 25th Chess Olympiad in Lucerne (+5, =5, -2).

Jacob Øst-Hansen played for Denmark in the European Team Chess Championships:
 In 1983, at sixth board in the 8th European Team Chess Championship in Plovdiv (+3, =3, -0) and won individual gold medal.

Jacob Øst-Hansen played for Denmark in the World Student Team Chess Championships:
 In 1972, at fourth board in the 19th World Student Team Chess Championship in Graz (+4, =5, -1),
 In 1974, at fourth board in the 20th World Student Team Chess Championship in Teesside (+6, =3, -3).

Jacob Øst-Hansen played for Denmark in the Nordic Chess Cup:
 In 1976, at first board in the 7th Nordic Chess Cup in Bremen (+2, =2, -1) and won team bronze medal,
 In 1989, at third board in the 12th Nordic Chess Cup in Aabybro (+1, =6, -0) and won team gold medal.

References

External links

Jacob Øst-Hansen chess games at 365chess.com

1952 births
Living people
Chess FIDE Masters
Danish chess players
Chess Olympiad competitors
20th-century chess players